Ronald Farrell  (born 26 September 1939) is a New Zealand former rugby league representative player. He played at representative level for New Zealand, New Zealand Māori, Wellington, and at club level for the Watersiders.

He played an unbeaten record 81 games for Wellington.

References

Wellington rugby league team players
New Zealand rugby league players
Rugby league second-rows
New Zealand Māori rugby league team players
1939 births
Living people